Manasaputra is a class of beings in Hinduism, referring to the 'mind-children', or the 'mind-born' sons of Brahma. In Hinduism, Brahma is believed to have created a number of children from his mind. 

These children of the mind are stated to sometimes be identical to the Prajapati, the progenitors of mankind of each age. The Manasaputra are believed to have created the first man, Svayambhuva Manu, and the first woman, Shatarupa, who had five children, who went on to populate the earth.

Lists 

According to the Vishnu Purana, the nine manasaputras of Brahma are: Bhrigu, Pulastya, Pulaha, Kratu, Angiras, Marichi, Daksha, Atri, and Vashistha. These sages are referred to as the Brahma rishis.

According to the Bhagavata Purana, some of the manasaputras are: Angiras (sage), Atri, Pulastya, Marichi, Pulaha, Jambavan, Bhrigu, Vashistha, Daksha, Narada, Chitragupta, the Four Kumaras, Himavat, and Shatarupa.

See also
Atharvan
Saptarishi
Prajapati

References 

Sanskrit words and phrases
Hindu mythology